Óscar Fabián Murillo Murillo (born 18 April 1988) is a Colombian professional footballer who plays as a centre-back for Liga MX club Pachuca and the Colombia national team.

Club career
Murillo began his career in the youth system of famed Argentinian side Boca Juniors. In 2007, he returned to Colombia to play for second division side Centauros Villavicencio. In 2008, he joined his hometown side Deportes Quindío and became a regular starter. His play with Quindío led to interest from foreign sides, particularly from Major League Soccer. He was signed on loan by Colorado Rapids in February 2010. His loan was terminated in July 2010 without Murillo making a single league appearance. On 20 February 2012, he played for Atlético Nacional and scored twice in their win against Millonarios FC.

Pachuca
On 10 December 2015, Pachuca announced that Murillo would be joining the team for the Clausura 2016.

International career
In May 2018 he was named in Colombia's preliminary 35 man squad for the 2018 World Cup in Russia.

Career statistics

International

Honours
Atlético Nacional
Categoría Primera A: 2013-I, 2013-II, 2014-I
Copa Colombia: 2012, 2013
Superliga Colombiana: 2012

Pachuca
Liga MX: Clausura 2016, Apertura 2022
CONCACAF Champions League: 2016–17

References

External links
 
 
 

1988 births
Living people
People from Armenia, Colombia
Colombian footballers
Colombia international footballers
Centauros Villavicencio footballers
Boca Juniors footballers
Deportes Quindío footballers
Colorado Rapids players
Deportivo Pereira footballers
Atlético Nacional footballers
C.F. Pachuca players
Categoría Primera A players
Argentine Primera División players
Liga MX players
Major League Soccer players
Colombian expatriate footballers
Expatriate footballers in Argentina
Expatriate soccer players in the United States
Expatriate footballers in Mexico
Colombian expatriate sportspeople in Argentina
Colombian expatriate sportspeople in the United States
Colombian expatriate sportspeople in Mexico
Association football central defenders
2018 FIFA World Cup players
2021 Copa América players
Colombian people of African descent